For the 1935 Vuelta a España, the field consisted of 50 riders including 32 Spanish riders; 29 finished the race.

By rider

By nationality

References

1935 Vuelta a España
1935